"Behind the Mask" is a 1979 song by Japanese synth-pop group Yellow Magic Orchestra. Initially an instrumental written by band member Ryuichi Sakamoto for a 1978 Seiko commercial, the song was elaborated upon with bandmates Haruomi Hosono and Yukihiro Takahashi and lyricist Chris Mosdell for inclusion on Solid State Survivor the following year. The song was later featured on the US release of X∞Multiplies in 1980, which combined tracks from the Japanese version and Solid State Survivor, and was released as a single in the US and UK to promote the album.

In the early 1980s, producer Quincy Jones brought the song to the attention of American pop singer Michael Jackson, who rewrote Mosdell's lyrics and added an accompanying melody. The Jackson version was planned for inclusion on his 1982 album Thriller, but was dropped following legal disputes. Since then, artists including Greg Phillinganes, Eric Clapton, and The Human League have recorded versions based on Jackson's updated version. Clapton's single was a top 20 hit in some markets in 1987, and a remixed version of Jackson's recording was released on his 2010 posthumous album Michael. Jackson's original 1982 demo was first made available on the second disc of Thriller 40 in November, 2022.

Yellow Magic Orchestra version 
The first studio rendition of "Behind the Mask" was recorded by Ryuichi Sakamoto's band Yellow Magic Orchestra, and appeared on their 1979 album Solid State Survivor. The Yellow Magic Orchestra version features music composed by Sakamoto and English lyrics written by poet and lyricist Chris Mosdell, which were sung by Sakamoto using a vocoder. Sakamoto had already composed the primary melody line when he asked Mosdell to write lyrics for the song. Mosdell based his lyrics on the imagery of a Japanese traditional Noh mask, as well as a poem by Irish poet W. B. Yeats called "The Mask".

Mosdell has said of the lyrics that "I was talking about a very impersonal, socially controlled society, a future technological era, and the mask represented that immobile, unemotional state." Yellow Magic Orchestra made use of synthesizers for the melodies and digital gated reverb for the snare drums.

In 1980, the song was released as a single in both the United States and the United Kingdom in support of those regions' versions of X∞Multiplies, which featured tracks from both the Japanese version of the album and Solid State Survivor (which was not initially released outside of Japan). The US release of the single included the X∞Multiplies track "Citizens of Science" as the B-side, while the latter used the Yellow Magic Orchestra track "Yellow Magic (Tong Poo)"; the UK 12" release of the single additionally featured "La Femme Chinoise" as a second B-side.

Track listing 
US promotional 7" single
 "Behind the Mask" (mono) – 3:35
 "Behind the Mask" (stereo) – 3:35

US promotional 12" single
 "Behind the Mask" - 3:35
 "Nice Age" - 3:55
 "Technopolis" - 4:15

US 7" single
 "Behind the Mask" – 3:35
 "Citizens of Science" – 4:33

UK (yellow vinyl and promotional black vinyl) and Italy 7" single
 "Behind the Mask" – 3:35
 "Yellow Magic (Tong Poo)" – 6:20

UK 12" single
 "Behind the Mask" – 3:35
 "Yellow Magic (Tong Poo)" – 6:20
 "La Femme Chinoise" – 6:05

Argentina 7" single
 "Cerca de la Mascara (Behind the Mask)" – 3:35
 "Vacacion de un Dia (Day Tripper)" – 2:39

1987 Ryuichi Sakamoto version 
Following the breakup of Yellow Magic Orchestra in 1983, Ryuichi Sakamoto re-recorded "Behind the Mask" in 1987 with Michael Jackson's additional lyrics and lead vocals by Bernard Fowler. A similar arrangement had been performed (with Fowler) during Sakamoto's Media Bahn Live tour the previous year. A CD single with three tracks and a CD maxi single with six tracks entitled "Behind the Mask +3" were released.

Track listing 
Japan CD single
 "Behind the Mask" – 5:29
 "Risky" – 6:22
 "Field Work" – 5:07

Japan CD maxi single ("Behind the Mask +3")
 "Behind the Mask" – 5:29
 "Risky" – 6:22
 "Field Work" – 5:07
 "Steppin' into Asia" (TV track) – 3:39
 "Field Work" (edit) – 2:34
 両眼微笑 (instrumental) – 3:57

Greg Phillinganes version

Michael Jackson's keyboardist Greg Phillinganes recorded a version of "Behind the Mask" for his 1984 album Pulse. Phillinganes first met Michael and his brothers during the sessions for The Jacksons' Destiny album in 1978, and went on to serve as musical director for Michael's Bad world tour.

Phillinganes released his version of the song as a single in 1985, and in the United States it reached number four on the Billboard Dance Club Songs chart and number 77 on the Billboard Hot R&B/Hip-Hop Songs chart.

Track listing
7" single
 "Behind the Mask" – 4:07
 "Only You" – 6:16

12" single
 "Behind the Mask" – 6:27
 "Behind the Mask" (instrumental) – 5:13
 "Only You" – 6:16

Personnel
 Greg Phillinganes – lead vocals, keyboards
 John Arrias – additional engineering
 Brian Banks – synthesizer programming
 Michael Boddicker – vocoder
 Michael Jackson – arrangement
 Anthony Marinelli – synthesizer programming
 Richard Page – additional backing vocals
 Howie Rice – clap effects
 John Vigran – additional engineering
 David Williams – guitars

Charts

Eric Clapton version

English musician Eric Clapton recorded "Behind the Mask" for his 1986 album August, and his version was released as a single in 1987.

Background and release
Greg Phillinganes, who had previously covered "Behind the Mask" himself, brought the composition to Clapton's attention. Phillinganes played keyboards and performed background vocals on Clapton's recording. This version failed to credit Michael Jackson as one of the song's co-writers, but Chris Mosdell has confirmed that Jackson's estate does in fact take 50% of the songwriting royalties from the recording.

Clapton's version of "Behind the Mask" was released as a single in January 1987. It peaked at number 15 on the UK Singles Chart on 21 February 1987.

Track listing
UK 7" single (928461-7, W8461)
 "Behind the Mask" (edit) – 3:38
 "Grand Illusion" – 4:30

UK 12" single (W8461)
 "Behind the Mask" (LP version) – 4:47
 "Grand Illusion" – 4:30
 "Wanna Make Love to You" – 5:36

UK 2 × 7" single (928461-7, W8461F)
 "Behind the Mask" (edit)
 "Grand Illusion"
 "Crossroads" (live)
 "White Room" (live)

Personnel
 Eric Clapton – guitar, vocals
 Phil Collins – drums, percussion, backing vocals, production
 Tom Dowd – associate production
 Nathan East – bass
 Paul Gomersall – engineering
 Peter Hefter – engineering
 Katie Kissoon – backing vocals
 Magic Moreno – engineering
 Tessa Niles – backing vocals
 Terry O'Neill – photography
 Greg Phillinganes – keyboards, backing vocals

Charts

Michael Jackson version

Michael Jackson recorded a version of "Behind the Mask", with extra lyrics and an extra melody line, during the recording sessions for his album Thriller after the song was brought to his attention by producer Quincy Jones, but the track did not make the album due to a royalties dispute with Yellow Magic Orchestra's management. A remixed version with extra overdubbed production by John McClain was eventually released on Jackson's 2010 posthumous album Michael. McClain's overdubs over the original 1982 tape include a newly recorded saxophone solo and crowd noise from the 1992 Live in Bucharest: The Dangerous Tour TV special. The singer Shanice provides background vocals on the song.

On February 21, 2011, the song was released by Epic Records as the third single from Michael. It was released as a single to radio and as a limited 7" for Record Store Day, and a music video edited together from fan contributions was released under the title "The Behind the Mask Project".

On November 18, 2022, the original demo of this song was released on the anniversary album, Thriller 40, as "Mike's Mix (Demo)".

Background and release
Quincy Jones heard Yellow Magic Orchestra's version during the Thriller sessions, and brought it to Michael Jackson, who recorded the song, added an extra melody line and a few extra lyrics to Chris Mosdell's original. Mosdell has said of the collaboration, "when Michael Jackson took it, he made it into a love song about a woman. It was a completely different premise to me, I was talking about a very impersonal, socially controlled society, a future technological era, and the mask represented that immobile, unemotional state. But hey, I let him have that one." An agreement to share the royalties equally between Sakamoto, Mosdell and Jackson broke down when the management of Yellow Magic Orchestra disagreed and it prevented the song from being released on Jackson's sixth studio album, Thriller. It remained unreleased for 28 years.

However, as a part of Sony Music's 10 album recording deal with the Estate of Michael Jackson, the song was announced to be released on the posthumous album of Jackson's, titled Michael. It was also as a radio single not only in France, but also the United States, Canada, and Japan.

Critical reception
The song received mainly positive reviews from music critics. Jody Rosen from Rolling Stone called the song "a fiercely funky cousin to "Wanna Be Startin' Somethin' ." Dan Martin from NME thought the song was "an absolute revelation, a swirl of psychedelic, orchestra-twinged R&B", and said "Jackson howls a solid-gold melody at his fearsome best, and blippy production and robotic backing vocals dancing behind it." Jason Lipshutz with Gail Mitchell and Gary Graff from Billboard thought the song was "a must-listen songs on Michael", and it "holds the highest number of Jackson's signature 'hee-hee!' exclaims". Joe Pareles from The New York Times said, the song was originally a 1979 hit by Ryuichi Sakamoto’s group Yellow Magic Orchestra with Jackson's lyrics about a coldhearted woman, but the final version which was completed by Mr. McClain was mixed with applause and squeals from concert crowds from Live in Bucharest: The Dangerous Tour DVD. Leah Greenblatt from Entertainment Weekly thought the song seemed "oddly dated by sax flourishes — though perhaps that makes it a good companion to the lilting closer Much Too Soon, an actual relic of the early ’80s". The author of the forthcoming book, Man in the Music: The Creative Life and Work of Michael Jackson, Joe Vogel thought John McClain's update to the song was skillful, making it sound brand new and retro at the same time. And he thought the song is "definitely one of the highlights of the album".

Music video
As the single release officially announced, a music video for this song was also announced to be released worldwide. On February 28, 2011, a project for this song's music video titled "Behind the Mask Project" was announced: "the Estate of Michael Jackson and Sony Music will provide everyone who likes music an opportunity to help create online a unique groundbreaking music video for the single 'Behind the Mask'." All the world can use a simple online tool to take part in making the music video since March 7, 2011. On March 30, 2011, a 17-second video of what Sony Music had been doing with some of the thousands of submissions for the "Behind the Mask Project" was released. On April 29, 2011, another video teaser for the project was released on michaeljackson.com, and it is announced that the final day to submit for the Behind the Mask Project is Tuesday May 3, 2011.
On June 6, 2011 was published the official trailer announcing when the final video would be published. On June 14, 2011 the official and final video was posted on the official Michael Jackson's channel on YouTube, but only accessible on the King of Pop's page on social networking site Facebook. A day after, the video was classified and is now more widely available.
This video has become in the most international, multi-collaborative of all times. In the 1600 clips that compose it can be seen people from the Sahara to the main cities of the world, through the Taj Mahal and the Arctic Circle. The clip is currently under evaluation for inclusion in the Guinness Book of World Records as the music video with the largest audience of participants. The oldest screen of this music video was recorded in 1996 by a Turkish boy Turgay Suat Tarcan.

An alternate video was originally shot and completed, featuring masked dancers in a nightclub, but the "Behind the Mask Project" was released instead of this video. This alternate video directed by the Grammy-winning directing duo Aggressive leaked on July 31, 2013. The video was eventually uploaded to Jackson's YouTube channel on August 3, 2018.

Track listing

Official versions
 Album Version 5:02
 Mike's Mix Demo Version 5:01
 Edit / Radio Edit 3:39
 Instrumental 5:02
 Edited Instrumental 3:39

Personnel
 Michael Jackson – solo vocal, beat box, background vocals, production
 Alex Al – bass
 Paulinho da Costa – percussion
 Khaliq Glover – mixing, engineering
 Alfonzo Jones – background vocals
 John McClain – production
 Jon Nettlesbey – additional keyboards, drum programming, sequencing, digital editing, mixing, engineering
 Greg Phillinganes – drums, additional keyboards
 Mike Phillips – saxophone, saxophonic percussion
 Shanice – background vocals
 Allen Sides – engineering
 Leon F. Sylvers III – background vocal arrangement, engineering
 David Williams – guitar
 Big Jim Wright – drums, keyboards, drum programming

Charts

Release history

Other versions
It was covered by The Human League in 1993 with Yellow Magic Orchestra.

A sample of the Greg Phillinganes version formed the basis for Goldie Lookin Chain's 2004 single "Your Mother's Got a Penis".

Señor Coconut had a cover version released in 2006.

References

1979 songs
1980 singles
1985 singles
1987 singles
2011 singles
Songs written by Ryuichi Sakamoto